The 1980–81 National Hurling League was the 50th season of the National Hurling League (NHL), an annual hurling competition for the GAA county teams.

Division 1

Structure

The National Hurling League's top division was divided into two groups - 1A and 1B. The top two teams in Division 1A advance to the semi-finals. The third- and fourth-placed teams in 1A, as well as the top two from 1B, play in the quarter-finals.

Division 1A table

Group stage

Division 1B table

Group stage

Knock-out stage

Play-offs

Quarter-finals

Semi-finals

Final

League statistics

Top scorers

Top scorers overall

Top scorers in a single game

Miscellaneous

 Waterford qualified for the semi-final stage of the league for the first time since the 1962-63 league.

Division 2

Table

References

National Hurling League seasons
League
League